Arnold M. Eisen, Ph.D. (born 1951) is an American Judaic scholar who was Chancellor of the Jewish Theological Seminary in New York. He stepped down at the end of the 2019-2020 academic year. Prior to this appointment, he served as the Koshland Professor of Jewish Culture and Religion and chair of the Department of Religious Studies at Stanford University. Prior to joining the Stanford faculty in 1986, he taught at Tel Aviv University and Columbia University.

The Jewish Theological Seminary
In 2006, Eisen was appointed as the seventh chancellor of The Jewish Theological Seminary, replacing Rabbi Dr. Ismar Schorsch. Eisen is the second non-rabbi, after Cyrus Adler, to hold this post. He is also the first person with a social science background to serve as chancellor; previous chancellors had backgrounds in Jewish history or Talmud. He took office as chancellor-elect on July 1, 2007, the day after Schorsch stepped down, and assumed the position full-time on July 1, 2008.

Since his appointment in 2007, he has increased JTS's impact on the communities it serves by transforming the education of religious leadership for Conservative Judaism; articulating a new vision for JTS; guiding the formulation of a strategic plan to implement that vision; and developing innovative programs in synagogue arts and practices, adult education, pastoral care, Jewish thought, interreligious dialogue, and the arts. His initiatives include new curricula for, and synergy among, all of JTS's five schools; the Institute for Jewish Learning at JTS (and its flagship program Context); the interfaith Center for Pastoral Education at JTS; and the Tikvah Institute for Jewish Thought. By 2011, his Mitzvah Initiative will involve some 75 congregations in a process of reflection upon "commandment, commandedness, and the Commander."

Scholarship and training
Arnold Eisen served in the Department of Religious Studies at Stanford University, the Department of Jewish Philosophy at Tel Aviv University, and the Department of Religion at Columbia University. Dr. Eisen earned a PhD in the History of Jewish Thought from Hebrew University, a BPhil in the Sociology of Religion at Oxford University, and a BA in Religious Thought from the University of Pennsylvania. He was a student of Professor Samuel Tobias Lachs. He previously served as senior lecturer at the Tel Aviv University and assistant professor at Columbia University.

Religious change
He believes that American Jews feel connected to Jewish ritual but maintain autonomy to decide what to practice and thus many do not attend synagogue regularly.

Eisen is a recognized expert in religious change and the modern transformation of Jewish religious belief and practice. He is also one of the world's foremost experts in the sociology of American Judaism. For the past twenty years, he has worked closely with synagogue and federation leadership around the country to analyze and address the issues of Jewish identity, the revitalization of Jewish tradition, and the redefinition of the American Jewish community.

Outside JTS
Dr. Eisen sits on the board of directors of the Tanenbaum Center, the Covenant Foundation, and the Taube Foundation, and chairs the steering committee of the Academic Consortium. He is married to Dr. Adriane Leveen, a professor of the Hebrew Bible (Tanakh) at the Reform Judaism movement's Hebrew Union College. They have two children, Shulie, a recent graduate of Brandeis University, and Nathaniel, a student at Stanford University.

Works
His recent publications include a personal essay, Taking Hold of Torah: Jewish Commitment and Community in America (1997), which addresses the renewal of Jewish community and commitment in America through a series of five essays built around the Five Books of Moses; a historical work about the origins of contemporary dilemmas concerning these issues, entitled Rethinking Modern Judaism: Ritual, Commandment, Community (1998); and The Jew Within: Self, Family and Community in America (2000), co-authored with sociologist Steven M. Cohen (2000), which examines the meanings of Judaism and Jewish belonging to contemporary American Jews.
Galut: Modern Jewish Reflection on Homelessness and Homecoming, Indiana University Press (Bloomington), 1986
Rethinking Modern Judaism: Ritual, Commandment, Community, University of Chicago Press (Chicago), 1998. (Koret Jewish Book Award, 1999)
The Jew Within: Self, Family, and Community in America
The Chosen People in America: A Study in Jewish Religious Ideology, Indiana University Press (Bloomington), 1983.
(Author of commentary) Michael Strassfeld, The Jewish Holidays: A Guide and Commentary, Harper & Row (New York City), 1985.
Taking Hold of Torah: Jewish Commitment and Community in America, Indiana University Press (Bloomington), 1997.
(With Steven M. Cohen) The Jew Within: Self, Family, and Community in America, Indiana University Press, 2000

Several of Eisen's shorter works and publications are available on the Berman Jewish Policy Archive @ NYU Wagner, including:
 Choosing Chosenness in America: The Changing Faces of Judaism (NYU Press: 2009)
 The Sovereign Self: Jewish Identity in Post-Modern America, with Steven M. Cohen (Jerusalem Center for Public Affairs: 2001)
 The Rhetoric of Chosenness and the Fabrication of American Jewish Identity (Transaction Publishers: 1990)

Arnold Eisen is also writing a series of essays for The Huffington Post. These are available to read here: http://www.huffingtonpost.com/arnold-m-eisen

In May, 2011, Eisen launched “Conservative Judaism: A Community Conversation,” an interactive website featuring original essays on Conservative Judaism, with responses from Movement and Lay leaders and scholars.

Awards
National Jewish Book Award, 1987, for Galut
National Jewish Book Award, Koret Foundation, 1998, for Rethinking Modern Judaism
Koret Prize, 1999, for outstanding contributions to the Jewish community
Marshall Sklare Award, 2018

References

Citations

Sources 

The Jewish Theological Seminary - Arnold Eisen Official JTSA biography
A Biography of Arnold Eisen
Sources say JTS Set to Select Eisen As Chancellor -- Forward
Arnie Eisen: Teaching Religion Raises Devilish Questions
Arnold M. Eisen Named New Chancellor of the Jewish Theological Seminary (press release)
Conservatives tap dynamic scholar, not rabbi, to head theological school
 Choice, May, 1984, p. 1319.
 Choice, February, 1987, pp. 896–897.
 Christian Century, January 25, 1984, pp. 88–89; January 5, 2000, Hayin Goren Perelmutter, review of Rethinking Modern Judaism, p. 37.
 Commentary, March, 1999, pp. 67–69.
 Judaism, summer, 1990, David Biale, review of Galut, pp. 376–379.
 Library Journal, November 1, 1986, p. 103; June 15, 1998, p. 84.
 Los Angeles Times Book Review, January 8, 1984, p. 8.
 New Leader, November, 2000, William B. Helmreich, review of The Jew Within, p. 33.
 Reference & Research Book News, August, 1998, p. 12.
 Religious Studies Review, October, 1987, p. 357.

1951 births
Living people
Jewish historians
Judaic scholars
20th-century American Jews
American Conservative Jews
Jewish Theological Seminary of America people
Central High School (Philadelphia) alumni
Columbia University faculty
Stanford University Department of Religious Studies faculty
Academic staff of Tel Aviv University
University of Pennsylvania alumni
Hebrew University of Jerusalem alumni
Alumni of the University of Oxford
21st-century American Jews